In mathematics, Borel transform may refer to 
A transform used in Borel summation
A generalization of this in Nachbin's theorem